Aldhun of Durham (died 1018 or 1019), also known as Ealdhun, was the last Bishop of Lindisfarne (based at Chester-le-Street) and the first Bishop of Durham. He was of "noble descent".

Since the late 9th century the see of Lindisfarne was based at Chester-le-Street because of constant attacks from invading Danes. However, in 994 King Æthelred II of England had paid a Danegeld (protection money) to King Sweyn I of Denmark and King Olaf I of Norway in return for peace. The pay-off worked and there followed a period of freedom from Viking raids. This encouraged Aldhun to return the remains of Cuthbert of Lindisfarne to their original resting place at Lindisfarne, and to reinstate the diocese there.

En route to their destination however Aldhun claimed to have received a vision from Cuthbert saying that the saint's remains should be laid to rest at Durham. The monks detoured then to Durham, and the title Bishop of Lindisfarne was transferred to Bishop of Durham. The removal of the see from Chester-le-Street to Durham took place in 995. Symeon of Durham is the main source for the moving of the see, and he states that Uhtred the Bold helped the monks clear the site of the new cathedral, which was consecrated in 998.

Aldhun was a bishop for 24 years, which puts his death in 1018 or 1019. He was said to have died of heartbreak because of the defeat of the Northumbrians by the Scots at the battle of Carham.

Aldhun's daughter Ecgfrida married first Uhtred the Bold who was Earl of Northumbria from 1006 to 1016. Their son Ealdred was the grandfather of Waltheof, Earl of Northumbria. After he repudiated her, she married a northern thegn Kilvert. The marriage probably took place close to the time when Uhtred helped her father move the see to Durham.

Citations

References

External links
 

1018 deaths
1019 deaths
Roman Catholic monks
Bishops of Lindisfarne
Bishops of Durham
10th-century English bishops
11th-century English Roman Catholic bishops
English Christian monks
Year of birth unknown